Baramulla Lok Sabha constituency is one of the five Lok Sabha (parliamentary) constituencies in Jammu and Kashmir in northern India. Baramulla has 11.5 lakh voters.

Previous Assembly segments
Baramulla Lok Sabha constituency is composed of the following assembly segments:
 Karnah (assembly constituency no. 1)
 Kupwara (assembly constituency no. 2)
 Lolab (assembly constituency no. 3)
 Handwara (assembly constituency no. 4)
 Langate (assembly constituency no. 5)
 Uri (assembly constituency no. 6)
 Rafiabad(assembly constituency no. 7)
 Sopore (assembly constituency no. 8)
 Gurez (assembly constituency no. 9)
 Bandipora (assembly constituency no. 10)
 Sonawari (assembly constituency no. 11)
 Sangrama (assembly constituency no. 12)
 Baramulla (assembly constituency no. 13)
 Gulmarg (assembly constituency no. 14)
 Pattan (assembly constituency no. 15)

New Assembly Segments

Members of Parliament
^ by poll

Election results

General elections 2019

General elections 2014

General elections 2009

General election 2004

See also
 Bandipora district
 Baramulla district
 Kupwara district
 List of Constituencies of the Lok Sabha

References

External links
Baramulla lok sabha  constituency election 2019 date and schedule

Lok Sabha constituencies in Jammu and Kashmir
Baramulla district
Kupwara district
Bandipora district
Baramulla